Oliver-Leming House, also known as the Home of the Missouri State Flag, is a historic home located at Cape Girardeau, Missouri.  It was designed by J.B. Legg, and built in 1898–1899.  It is a -story, red brick dwelling. It features a full-width, two-story front portico supported by Corinthian order columns and added in 1915.

It was listed on the National Register of Historic Places in 1980.

References

Houses on the National Register of Historic Places in Missouri
Houses completed in 1899
Houses in Cape Girardeau County, Missouri
National Register of Historic Places in Cape Girardeau County, Missouri